Iguaçu Park is a park located in Curitiba, state of Paraná, Brazil

References

External links
Parque Iguaçu / Zoológico de Curitiba (in Portuguese)

Parks in Curitiba